Coptotriche alavelona is a moth of the family Tischeriidae. It is found on Madagascar.

References
Lees & Stonis, 2007. The first record of Tischeriidae (Insecta: Lepidoptera) from Madagascar, with description of Coptotriche alavelona sp. n. and an updated distributional checklist of Afrotropical Tischeriidae. Zootaxa (2007) Vol.: 1645, Issue: 1645, Pages: 35-45

Moths described in 2007
Tischeriidae
Moths of Madagascar
Moths of Africa